Thomas Oliver Larkin (September 16, 1802 – October 27, 1858), known in Spanish as Don Tomás Larkin, was an American diplomat and businessman. Larkin served as the only U.S. consul to Alta California during the Mexican era and was covertly involved in U.S. plans to annex California from Mexico. Following the American Conquest of California and the end of the Mexican-American War, Larkin was a delegate to the Monterey Constitutional Convention in 1849 and a signatory of the Constitution of California.

Early years
Larkin was born in Charlestown, Massachusetts, the son of Thomas O. Larkin and Ann Rogers, and a grandson of the Deacon John Larkin who provided the horse for Paul Revere's famous ride. Larkin's mother was widowed three times – her first husband was named Cooper and her third husband was named Amariah Childs, a spice mill owner and banker in Lynn, Massachusetts.

At the age of 15, Larkin went to Boston to apprentice as a bookbinder but decided against the business. In 1821 he sailed to Wilmington, North Carolina, where he worked as a clerk and experienced a disastrous partnership with a dishonest merchant. He visited Bermuda in 1822 and relatives in New England in 1824. In 1825 he opened a store in Duplin, North Carolina. The fortune he made on the store he lost on a sawmill operation, and in 1830 he returned to Massachusetts, destitute. He received a letter from his half-brother, John Bautista Rogers Cooper, who persuaded him that California was full of opportunity, and asked for his assistance with his business in California. In September 1831 Thomas left Boston on the ship Newcastle.  

During the months-long voyage, he met and had an intimate relationship with 24 year old Mrs. Rachel Hobson Holmes, who was coming to California to join her husband, Captain A. C. Holmes, a Danish seaman. The Newcastle made a stopover in Hawai'i before arriving in San Francisco and then Monterey in April 1832. There were no accommodations in the small town and they both resided at the Cooper house. Upon learning she was carrying Thomas’ child, Rachel discreetly moved to Santa Barbara where her husband's ship was expected. Thomas remained in Monterey, working with his brother. At Santa Barbara, Rachel gave birth to a daughter she named Isabel Ann in January 1833. Wondering how she would explain the child to her husband, she learned within a few weeks that he had died a year before while at sea enroute from Acapulco to Lima.

Meanwhile, Larkin worked as a clerk for John B. R. Cooper until early 1833, when he was able to start a small store of his own and build a "double geared" flour mill, the first of its kind on the West Coast. He was able to invest again in a sawmill, this time in Santa Cruz. He sailed to Santa Barbara and there was reunited with Rachel. They were married on board the American bark Volunteer, on June 10, 1833. The U. S. Consul for Hawai'i, John Coffin Jones, performed the ceremony. Isabel died in July 1833, a month after the wedding. Years later it they discovered Jones did not have the authority to perform the service and they had to be remarried. They had eight more children, five of whom survived to adulthood. 

Larkin built the Sherman Quarters in 1834. In 1835 he built the first two-story house in California, a combination of New England and California building materials and methods that is today known as Monterey Colonial architecture. Larkin House survives today and is part of Monterey State Historic Park. Larkin also built the first wharf at Monterey harbor and was commissioned to rebuild the Customhouse. He built the House of the Four Winds in 1834 (or 1840). The building was used as the first State of California Hall of Records. 

At that time, all foreign ships had to check in at Monterey to pay import/export tariffs and get official permission to trade. Larkin was well-positioned to engage in trade with Mexico, the United States and other countries. British and American trade with China came to the Pacific Coast by way of Hawai'i.

Alta California

As a prominent figure in the occasional capital of a distant province of an occasionally unstable nation, Larkin stood in a position of influence that could easily have been his undoing if he chose the wrong side. The fact that he was able to survive through shifting administrations is testimony to his political skills. Despite being a supporter of Governor Juan Bautista Alvarado, he did not involve himself with Alvarado's accusations against Isaac Graham and other foreign residents of the Monterey area, and was not one of those sent to prison in chains in 1840. Larkin loaned money to Alvarado’s successor, Micheltorena, which he lost when the Governor was overthrown by Alvarado in 1844. He never applied for Mexican citizenship, which required conversion to Catholicism; instead he renewed his visa annually to maintain his legal status. As a non-citizen, he could not legally own land, but he managed to obtain land grants in the names of his children.

In 1842, Monterey was surprised by the actions of U.S. Commodore Thomas ap Catesby Jones, who landed Marines to take over Monterey in the mistaken belief that war had broken out between the United States and Mexico. Larkin and William Hartnell worked to smooth over the situation. Jones was induced to submit a written apology to the angry Mexican officials and withdraw his troops. The Commodore was subsequently removed from his command, but U.S.–Mexican relations remained tense.

The successful conclusion to the affair brought Larkin to the attention of officials in Washington, and in 1843 President Tyler appointed Larkin as the first (and last) American consul to Alta California. The following year, he thwarted a British attempt to acquire California while he was assisting the Mexican government in building a smallpox hospital in Monterey.

With the rise of James K. Polk to the Presidency in 1845, war with Mexico seemed unavoidable. Larkin hired William Leidesdorff as Vice Consul in San Francisco, thus relieving himself of some of the burden of the office.

Bear Flag Revolt
Early in 1846, Larkin received instructions from Secretary of State James Buchanan to begin working covertly to assure all concerned that the United States would support any attempt at secession from Mexico. Toward this end, he secretly employed Abel Stearns to work in southern California. He volunteered to go to Mexico City on behalf of the United States to work out a peaceful settlement, but Congress had already declared war by the time his letter arrived in Washington. He had entered into a dialog with General Mariano Vallejo with the goal of arranging a peaceful annexation of California when the Bear Flag Revolt began on 14 June 1846 and the General was captured and imprisoned by a band of Americans who had heard a rumor that the Mexican authorities were thinking of arresting all Americans.

In 1846, Marine Lieutenant Archibald Gillespie was sent by President James Polk with secret messages to U.S. Consul Thomas O. Larkin in Monterey, California, Commodore John D. Sloat commanding the Pacific Squadron and John C. Frémont. Gillespie, after traveling in secret across Mexico and catching a ship to California arrived early June 1846 with the verbal messages from Polk. What was in the messages are unknown but the Bear Flag revolt came as a surprise to Larkin. On 7 July 1846, when Commodore John D. Sloat with three ships occupied Monterey with his marines and "blue-jackets" (enlisted sailors) and raised the American flag over the Customs House. Commodore (Rear Admiral) Robert Field Stockton replaced Sloat a week later as commander of the Pacific Squadron. Stockton appointed Fremont commander of the volunteer militia formed around his 60-man Corps of Topographical Engineers and the Bear Flag Republicans as the California Battalion and dispatched 160 of them on the USS Cyane (1837) to occupy San Diego and Los Angeles with marine and blue-jacket help. Larkin joined the force sailing for southern California which by 13 August had peacefully occupied San Diego, California and Los Angeles. General José Castro and Governor Pío Pico fled south.  Commodore Stockton, the senior military officer in California, appointed Larkin as Naval agent, and Larkin returned to Monterey.

The apparently peaceful conquest of California soon began to fray at the edges in southern California.  Revolts broke out in Los Angeles, and the occupation forces under Archibald Gillespie and his 30-40 men were driven out.  José Castro returned, and Larkin moved his family to Yerba Buena (San Francisco) as the Californios throughout the province were attempting to repel the thinly spread out California Battalion garrison troops and Navy forces. Larkin was captured outside of the city when, against advice, he tried to go to his deathly ill daughter, still in Monterey. Larkin was forced to ride to Santa Barbara. En route, he witnessed the inconclusive Battle of Natividad (near Salinas) from General Castro's side. He was later imprisoned in Los Angeles and was not reunited with his family until after the signing of the Treaty of Cahuenga which ended four months of skirmishes. His daughter died while he was a captive.

United States

Now free to own land in his own name, Larkin turned his attention to his new opportunities. In partnership with Robert Semple, he established the city at the Carquinez Straits that became Benicia, but Larkin’s business interests were in San Francisco and he sold out his share after a few years. As he took control of his own affairs, his relationship with Leidesdorff fell apart.  By the time gold was discovered, Larkin had permanently settled in the city by the Bay and was in the next few years able to reap a fortune from the economic boom that followed. It was as a representative from San Francisco that he served at the 1849 Constitutional Convention, held in Monterey.

Early in 1850, he built the first brick building in San Francisco at 1116 Stockton Street.  Later in 1850 they moved to New York. They rented a comfortable suite at the Irving House, a hotel that was popular with Californians. In November they bought and renovated at great expense an eighteen-room home in a good neighborhood.  Their new home soon acquired the reputation they had gained in California for lavish hospitality. But the cold and damp eastern weather did not agree with them. Rachel and the children endured repeated bouts of illness. Thomas acquired an acute skin disease and was so ill for two months that newspapers mistakenly announced his death. When he finally began to recover, Rachel, who had helped doctor him, collapsed from exhaustion. 

In May 1853, they returned to San Francisco where their health improved. They found good schools for the two youngest children and resumed their busy social and business lives. They built an opulent mansion and enjoyed the civic improvements that had taken place in San Francisco as a consequence of the California Gold Rush since they left for New York. During this time Larkin pressed the Federal government for compensation for money he claimed he had spent on Naval supplies and for work on the Monterey Customs House and the wharf there, without satisfaction.

Larkin acquired several land grants including Rancho Jimeno, Rancho Boga, Rancho Cienega del Gabilan, Rancho Pleyto, Rancho Cotate, and Rancho Larkin’s Children. In his last years, Larkin engaged in land speculation and was thought by some to be the richest man in America.

Death

On October 27, 1858, while at Colusa, California, he contracted typhoid fever and died within a week. He was buried in what was the Laurel Hill Cemetery in San Francisco, but he is now interred at Cypress Lawn Memorial Park in Colma, California. An obituary was published in the Sacramento Daily Union on October 29, 1858.

Genealogy
Rachel M. Hobson (Ipswich, Massachusetts, April 30, 1807 – San Francisco, October 29, 1873) was the daughter of Daniel and Eliza Hobson.

Children, surnamed Larkin,
 Isabel Ann (Santa Barbara, January, 1833 – July, 1833)
 Thomas Oliver, Jr., (Monterey, April 13, 1834 – San Francisco, July, 1898), named as the first white child born of American parents in California, his elder half-sister being the result of his mother's first marriage.
 William Rogers (August 25, 1835 – Monterey, January 6, 1836)
 Frederick Hobson (December 23, 1836 – May 14, 1869)
 Henry Rogers (May 26, 1838 – Monterey, November 18, 1838)
 Francis Rogers (January 28, 1840 – San Francisco, July 7, 1874)
 Carolina Ann (Monterey, March 24, 1842 – 1891) m. (2) 1862-10-02 to William Sampson Tams, son of Sampson and Ann Hennessey (Deas) Tams, (1) 1860-11-03 to William Lindzey Hamilton b. 1832 at Philadelphia, d. 1862-02-01.
 Sophia Adeline (June 20, 1843 – San Francisco, November 28, 1846)
 Alfred Otis (b. Monterey, April 10, 1847)

Legacy 

The Larkin House in Monterey is a National Historic Landmark and California Historical Landmark.  Larkin Street in San Francisco is named for him.  An elementary school in Monterey, now closed, was named for him.

Notes

Sources
 Frank Soule, John H. Gihon, James Nisbet; The annals of San Francisco: containing a summary of the history of the first discovery, settlement, progress, and present condition of California and a complete history of all the important events connected with its great city; to which are added, biographical memoirs of some prominent citizens [New York, 1855] p. 758
 Rayner Wickersham Kelsey, Ph.D., the United States Consulate in California [Berkeley, 1910]
 Eldredge MS Padrone, Monterey, 1836
 Grizzly Bear, May 1928, p. 58
 Rafael Gorney, Diary of Rafael Gorney, in Historical Society of Southern California, Sept. 1963, p. 265
 Rockwell Dennis Hunt, California and Californians [Chicago, 1926] Vol 3: 127–28
 Pioneer, v. 13, p. 107, Aug. 1898
 Los Angeles Blue Book, 1956, p. 441
 Los Angeles Herald Express, 1948-07-31
 William Ensign Lincoln, Some descendants of Stephen Lincoln of Wymondham, England... [Pittsburg, 1930]
 Myrtle Garrison, Romance & History of California Ranchos [San Francisco, c. 1935]

Further reading
 Hague, Harlan and David J. Langum, Thomas O. Larkin: A Life of Patriotism and Profit in Old California [University of Oklahoma Press, 1990]
 Larkin, T. O., & In Hawgood, J. A. (1962). First and last consul: Thomas Oliver Larkin and the Americanization of California. San Marino, Calif: Huntington Library.
 Underhill, R. L. (1939). From cowhides to golden fleece: A narrative of California, 1832–1858 : based upon unpublished correspondence of Thomas Oliver Larkin, trader, developer, promoter, and only American consul. Stanford University, Calif: Stanford University Press.

External links

 Guide to the Thomas O. Larkin Papers at The Bancroft Library

California pioneers
Foreign residents of Mexican California
People of the Conquest of California
1802 births
1858 deaths
American emigrants to Mexico
American people of the Bear Flag Revolt
American expatriates in Mexico
Deaths from typhoid fever
Businesspeople from San Francisco

People from Monterey, California

Burials at Cypress Lawn Memorial Park
19th-century American businesspeople
Burials at Laurel Hill Cemetery (San Francisco)